Antoinette Sassou Nguesso (born May 7, 1945 in Brazzaville) is a Congolese retired teacher and public figure who has held the role of First Lady of the Republic of the Congo since 1997 as the wife of President Denis Sassou Nguesso. She also held the position of First Lady from 1979 to 1992 during her husband's first presidential tenure.

Biography
Sassou Nguesso was born Antoinette Loemba Tchibota on May 7, 1945, in Brazzaville to Pascal Loemba Tchibota and Marie-Louise Djembo. Her parents, who were originally from Kakamoéka, divorced when she was a child. Her mother later remarried to her second husband, François Gallo Poto, a cousin of the Antoinette Gbetigbia Gogbe Yetene (d. 1977), first wife of Mobutu Sese Seko, the President of Zaire. Sassou Nguesso's mother, who became known as Mama Poto Galo, died in January 2005 and was buried in Gombe Cemetery in Kinshasa in the neighboring Democratic Republic of Congo. Following her parents' divorce, Sassou Nguesso was raised in both Pointe-Noire and Brazzaville. She attended elementary school in both cities, before enrolling in a girl's college in Mouyondzi.

Sassou Nguesso is a retired teacher. Sassou Nguesso has been president of a Congolese NGO, the Congo Assistance Foundation (la Fondation Congo Assistance), since its establishment on May 7, 1984.

The first lady routinely travels with her personal hairdresser, the Brazzaville-based stylist Amédée Ebono, on all official trips.

In June 2016, Sassou Nguesso was subpoenaed to appear in an American court while traveling in Washington D.C. The case stems from an ongoing 1980 debt dispute between the American company Commisimpex and the Congolese government under President Denis Sassou Nguesso. The company maintains that it was never compensated for its work by the Sassou Nguesso government. First Lady Sassou Nguesso was summoned to the U.S. court to answer questions regarding her family's assets, as well as government finances. Antoinette Sassou Nguesso ignored the subpoena and did not appear in court.

Sassou Nguesso's family remains the subject of several legal and financial investigations in the U.S. and France. The French Ministry of Justice seized a real estate complex located in the 17th arrondissement of Paris which had been purchased in Antoinette Sassou Nguesso's name.

References

Living people
1945 births
First ladies of the Republic of the Congo
People from Brazzaville
People from Pointe-Noire